Senator Schmitt may refer to:

Eric Schmitt (born 1975), U.S. senator from Missouri
Harrison Schmitt (born 1935), U.S. senator from New Mexico
Matt Schmit (fl. 2010s), Minnesota State Senate

See also
Senator Schmidt (disambiguation)
Senator Schmitz (disambiguation)